The Players Tour Championship 2011/2012 – Event 9 (also known as the 2011 Acuerate Antwerp Open for sponsorship purposes) was a professional minor-ranking snooker tournament that took place between 10 and 13 November 2011 at the Lotto Arena in Antwerp, Belgium.

Judd Trump won the sixth professional title of his career by defeating Ronnie O'Sullivan 4–3 in the final.

Prize fund and ranking points
The breakdown of prize money and ranking points of the event is shown below:

1 Only professional players can earn ranking points.

Main draw

Preliminary rounds

Round 1 
Best of 7 frames

Round 2 
Best of 7 frames

Round 3 
Best of 7 frames

Main rounds

Top half

Section 1

Section 2

Section 3

Section 4

Bottom half

Section 5

Section 6

Section 7

Section 8

Finals

Century breaks 
Only from last 128 onwards. 

 137  Nigel Bond
 136  Liu Chuang
 135  Dominic Dale
 133, 110, 101  Jack Lisowski
 132, 118, 116, 105, 100  Ronnie O'Sullivan
 130  Graeme Dott
 128, 124, 119, 100  Judd Trump
 127, 119, 105, 100  Neil Robertson
 124  Cao Yupeng
 120  Ricky Walden
 120  John Higgins
 120  Matthew Stevens
 119, 118, 102  Mark Selby
 119  Mark King
 119  Steve Davis
 118  Aditya Mehta

 117  Ryan Day
 112, 106  Alan McManus
 112  Jamie Jones
 110  Michael Holt
 109, 101  David Morris
 108  David Hogan
 108  Jimmy White
 106  Andrew Higginson
 105  Stephen Hendry
 104  Jamie Cope
 103  Marcus Campbell
 103  Barry Pinches
 101  Mark Davis
 100  Andy Hicks
 100  Ken Doherty

References

External links 
 

2011
09
2011 in Belgian sport